ZMW can mean:
 Zero-mode waveguide
 ZMW attack, a possible denial-of-service attack on the Internet infrastructure juhugo 
 Zambian kwacha, the ISO 4217 code for the currency of Zambia